The Hardest Part Tour is the third concert tour by American singer Noah Cyrus, in support of her debut studio album, The Hardest Part (2022). The tour begins on October 4, 2022, in Phoenix, Arizona and ends on November 14, 2022, in Los Angeles, California.

Development 

Cyrus first announced on April 8, 2022, that her debut studio album The Hardest Part would be released on July 15, 2022, with the release of its lead single "I Burned LA Down". Later that week, she announced that she would embark on The Hardest Part Tour in support of it. European dates were announced first, which included her involvement on Justin Bieber's Justice World Tour in Helsinki, Finland and her performance in the Pukkelpop and Lowlands festivals in the Netherlands and Belgium, respectively. After the release of the second single of the album, "Mr. Percocet", dates for the North American leg were announced, including her performances in the Austin City Limits Music Festival in Austin, Texas.

On July 28, 2022, Cyrus announced all European dates were cancelled due to unforeseen circumstances.

Setlist 

 1. Noah (Stand Still)
 2. Mr. Percocet
 3. Unfinished
 4. Liar
 5. The Worst Of You
 6. Ready To Go
 7. All Three
 8. My Side Of The Bed
 9. Loretta's Song
 10. I'll Fly Away (Alison Krauss cover)
 11. I Got So High That I Saw Jesus
 12. Again
 13. I Just Want A Lover
 14. Every Beginning Ends
 15. I Burned LA Down
 16. Hardest Part

Tour dates

Cancelled shows

References 

Concert tours of North America
2022 concert tours